Lake Sylbicë is a large mountain lake in the Accursed Mountains range in the north of Albania with an area of . This lake is surrounded with meadows and is just east of the somewhat larger Lake Dash.

References

Sylbice
Accursed Mountains